Coachford College is a post primary school located in Coachford, County Cork, Ireland. Situated in the Lee Valley, 22 km west of Cork city, the catchment area stretches from Kanturk to Bandon, and from Ballincollig to Macroom. Coachford College is part of Cork Education and Training Board (ETB). As of 2017, there were over 610 students enrolled in the school, increasing to 817 students by 2020.

Enrolment

Enrolment in Coachford College is in accordance with their admissions policy. Coachford College is the sole provider in the catchment boundary area and most students from primary schools in the area attend Coachford College. 114 students started in Coachford College in September 2015, 134 starting in Sept 2016, 137 starting in Sept 2017, 142 students starting in Sept 2018, 152 students starting in 2019.

In 2015, additional school developments were announced for Coachford College to accommodate 1000 students. A temporary accommodation block of seven classrooms opened in May 2021, and funding was allocated in 2020 for the construction of a new school building.

The school uses Google Classroom, and also uses VSWare to assist parents in accessing student attendance and academic progress.

Activities
In sport, male students have the option of playing hurling, football or volleyball, while female students can play camogie, basketball, volleyball or ladies football. The school also has/had an equestrian team, a golf team, athletics team as well as a frisbee team. while volleyball made a debut for both boys and girls.

The school hosts an annual dance competition in January called The Great Coachford Dance-Off which is organised by TY students with the proceeds being donated to charity.

References

External links
 Coachford College website

Secondary schools in County Cork
1953 establishments in Ireland
Educational institutions established in 1953